Leanne Best (born 15 June 1979) is an English actress. She is the niece of former Beatle, Pete Best.  She trained at the Liverpool Institute for Performing Arts and presently lives in southwest London.

She is known for her roles as Jane Cobden in the BBC series Ripper Street, Celia Donnelly in Fortitude, and the titular role of 'The Woman In Black' in the 2014 film The Woman in Black 2: Angel of Death. Best also appeared as Min Sakul in the sequel Star Wars: The Force Awakens (2015).

More recently Best appeared in ITV comedy series Cold Feet in September 2016 as Tina Reynolds. She was also in Line of Duty series 3.

Filmography

Awards and nominations

References

External links
Leanne Best at the British Film Institute

1980 births
Actresses from Liverpool
English film actresses
English television actresses
21st-century English actresses
Living people